Dermot O'Brien (23 October 1932 – 22 May 2007) was an Irish céilí and showband musician and singer, as well as a Gaelic footballer who played as a centre-forward at senior level for  the Louth senior football team.

Gaelic football career
O'Brien made his first appearance for the Louth team during the 1952 championship and was a regular member of the starting fifteen until a broke finger ended his career in 1960. During that time he has won one All-Ireland winners' medal and two Leinster winners' medals. In 1957 O'Brien captained the team to the All-Ireland title.

At club level O'Brien was a three-time county club championship medalist with St Mary's.

Musical career
A long-time amateur musician, in 1962 O'Brien became a professional musician when his band the Clubmen went professional; O'Brien played the piano accordion for the band rather than the more typical Irish button accordion. Dermot O'Brien and the Clubmen had considerable musical success, with their hit single "The Merry Ploughboy" (a cover of a Dominic Behan song about joining the Irish Republican Army) reaching the top of the Irish Singles Chart in only seven days and holding that position for six weeks in late 1966. The single was rushed to market to compete with a Top 100-ranking cover of the same song by the Abbey Tavern Singers.

In the late 1960s, O'Brien began his own RTÉ show called The Styles of O'Brien.

In 2018, Brown University students started a Dermot O'Brien appreciation club.

References

External links
Dermot O'Brien and his Clubmen (1962–1972) at IrishShowbands.com

 

1933 births
2007 deaths
All-Ireland-winning captains (football)
Irish accordionists
Louth inter-county Gaelic footballers
Musicians from County Louth
People from Ardee
RTÉ people
St Mary's (Louth) Gaelic footballers
20th-century accordionists